Susan Parker Bodine is an American lawyer and government official who served as the Assistant Administrator for Enforcement and Compliance Assurance at the Environmental Protection Agency. She also previously served as chief counsel for the United States Senate Committee on Environment and Public Works.  She was appointed in 2017 and left the agency in 2021.

Bodine also previously served as Assistant Administrator of the Environmental Protection Agency's Office of Solid Waste and Emergency Response during the administration of George W. Bush. She has also served as staff director and counsel for the United States House Transportation Subcommittee on Water Resources and Environment, as an associate at Covington & Burling, and as a partner at Barnes & Thornburg.

In 2021 Bodine became a partner at the law and lobbying firm Earth & Water Law, which represents corporations in pollution cases.

References

Living people
Princeton University alumni
University of Pennsylvania Law School alumni
21st-century American lawyers
George W. Bush administration personnel
Trump administration personnel
People of the United States Environmental Protection Agency
Year of birth missing (living people)